Smackwater Jack is a 1971 studio album by Quincy Jones. Tracks include the theme music to Ironside and The Bill Cosby Show.

Track listing
 "Smackwater Jack" (Gerry Goffin, Carole King) – 3:31
 "Cast Your Fate to the Wind" (Vince Guaraldi, Carel Werber) – 4:26
 "Ironside" (Quincy Jones) – 3:53
 "What's Going On" (Renaldo "Obie" Benson, Al Cleveland, Marvin Gaye) – 9:51
 "Theme from The Anderson Tapes" (from The Anderson Tapes) (Jones) – 5:16
 "Brown Ballad" (Ray Brown) – 4:20
 "Hikky Burr" (Bill Cosby, Jones) – 4:02
 "Guitar Blues Odyssey: From Roots to Fruits" (Jones) – 6:35

Personnel
Quincy Jones – arranger, conductor, vocals
Joshie Armstead, Valerie Simpson, Bill Cosby, Marilyn Jackson – vocals
Freddie Hubbard, Marvin Stamm – flugelhorn
Buddy Childers, Snooky Young, Joe Newman, Ernie Royal – trumpet
Wayne Andre, Garnett Brown – trombone
Eric Gale, Arthur Adams, Freddie Robinson, Jim Hall, Joe Beck – guitar
Toots Thielemans – guitar, harmonica, whistler
Grady Tate – drums, percussion
Paul Humphrey – drums
Bob James, Joe Sample – keyboards
Jaki Byard, Monty Alexander, Bobby Scott – piano
Jimmy Smith – electronic organ
Dick Hyman – piano, electric harpsichord
Carol Kaye, Chuck Rainey – electric bass
Ray Brown, Bob Cranshaw – double bass
Hubert Laws – flute, saxophone
Milt Jackson – vibraphone
Pete Christlieb, Jerome Richardson – tenor saxophone
Edd Kalehoff, Paul Beaver – Moog synthesizer

Charts

References

1971 albums
Quincy Jones albums
Albums arranged by Quincy Jones
Albums arranged by Marty Paich
Albums produced by Phil Ramone
A&M Records albums
Albums conducted by Quincy Jones